Claire Keim (born Claire Lefebvre 8 July 1975) is a French actress and singer.

Biography
Keim was born in Senlis, Oise to an architect father and a dentist mother.
She is in a relationship with French footballer Bixente Lizarazu, and lives in Saint-Jean-de-Luz and Paris. She gave birth to their daughter Uhaina in August 2008.

Filmography

References

External links

  
 

1975 births
Living people
People from Senlis
French film actresses
French television actresses
20th-century French actresses
21st-century French actresses
Cours Florent alumni
21st-century French singers
21st-century French women singers